Protinopalpa subclathrata is a moth in the family Crambidae. It was described by Strand in 1911. It is found in Tanzania.

References

Endemic fauna of Tanzania
Moths described in 1911
Pyraustinae